Francisco de Ayeta (dates unknown) was a Spanish Franciscan missionary of the 17th century, in New Spain.

Life

He became successively Visitor of the Province of the Holy Evangel of New Mexico, and its Procurator at Madrid as well as Commissary of the Inquisition in New Spain. 

Ayeta investigated remote missions personally, especially those of New Mexico, and he was the first to warn the Spanish authorities of the incipient Pueblo revolt. His report, from 1678, induced the authorities of New Spain to reinforce the garrison at Santa Fe, but it was too late. The Pueblos broke out on 10 August, 1680, and for 14 years New Mexico was lost to Spain. Ayeta hurried to El Paso, and when 2000 fugitives from the North reached that post, Ayeta was the first to offer them the needed relief in food and clothing.

Works

Three books are known to have been published by him, all without date and place. The first is "Apología del orden de San Francisco en América", which is supposed to have appeared about 1690; the second, "Defensa de la provincia del Santa Evangelio de México sobre la retención de los curatos y doctrinas"; and the third "Ultimo recurso de la provincia de San José de Yucatan sobre despojo de parroquias". He defended the regular orders in Mexico, whom the secular authorities wanted to  deprive of their missions. Ayeta became one of the most fervent defenders of the Franciscans, and he wrote very aggressively.

References

Vetancurt, Cronica de la provincia del Santa Evangelio de Mexico (2d ed., Mexico, 1871); 
Beristain de Souza, Biblioteca Hispano-americana setentrional (Mexico, 1816), I; 
Sarinana Y Cuenca, Oracion funebre ... en las exequieas de veinte y uno religiosos de la observancia & ca. Que murieron a manos de los Indios apostatas del Nuevo Mexico (Mexico, 1681). This sermon is manifestly based upon the data furnished by Ayeta in a yet unpublished report on the priests who were murdered in 1680. 
Bandelier, Histoire de la colonisation et des missions du Sonora, Chihuahua, Nouveau Mexique, et Arizona, jusq'a l'an 1700 (MSS. at the Vatican, 1888).

Further reading 

Documentos para la historia de Mexico (third series, very rare); 
Bandelier, Documentary History of the Zuni Tribe, in Journal Am. Arch., No. 1.

17th-century Spanish people
Spanish Franciscans
Spanish Roman Catholic  missionaries
Roman Catholic missionaries in New Spain
Franciscan missionaries